Mariusz Wach (born 14 December 1979) is a Polish professional boxer. He challenged once for the unified WBA (Super), IBF, WBO, and IBO heavyweight titles against Wladimir Klitschko in 2012.

Early life
Mariusz Wach was born 14 December 1979 in Krakow, Poland. He emigrated to North Bergen, New Jersey as an adult.

Amateur career
Wach first became acquainted with boxing in 1990, amassing a 90-fight amateur career that saw him represent his native Poland in numerous amateur tournaments. Among his greatest achievements during that period were winning two gold medals and a bronze in the Individual Polish Championships and a silver in the 2004 European Union Championships. Wach later represented Poland in the 2004 Summer Olympics as an alternate.

Professional career

Early career
Wach turned pro in April 2005 and defeated Deniss Melniks by first-round knockout in Świebodzice, Poland. He made his American debut in January 2006 by defeating Adele Olakanye by decision on the undercard of Arturo Gatti's destruction of Thomas Damgaard at the Boardwalk Hall in Atlantic City, NJ. Wach won seven fights that year, including five in America which was highlighted by winning the Polish International heavyweight title by a ninth-round knockout of Arthur Cook in Illinois. A few months later he won a belt in TWBA federation. In April 2009 in Jaroslaw, Poland Wach blasted out his American opponent Julius Long and defended his title of the World Champion in TWBA. Mariusz has also served as a sparring partner for several well-known boxers, including former heavyweight champion Samuel Peter. In 2010, after being sidelined for a year due to injury, Wach returned to the ring in great shape and turned in one of his best performances as a professional, knocking out Christian Hammer in six rounds in Germany.

In September 2010, Wach was invited by Mariusz Kolodziej, CEO of Global Boxing Promotions, to move to the United States and train at Global Boxing Gym in North Bergen, NJ. Under the guidance of former heavyweight champion Michael Moorer, Wach began his 2-month training camp in preparation for his matchup with Jonathan Haggler. In his first fight of 2011 – against Haggler in Newark, NJ – Wach scored a third-round knockout to win the WBC Baltic heavyweight title. After this fight, Wach signed a promotional agreement with Mariusz Kolodziej of Global Boxing Promotions and Jimmy Burchfield of CES.

Wach's first big test came in July 2011, when he faced off with Kevin McBride, who ended Mike Tyson's career as a boxer. Wach was quicker and sharper, and with one right cross, knocked McBride out cold in the fourth round winning the WBC International heavyweight title.

Wach returned to the Mohegan Sun Arena just four months later with another statement-making performance, this time knocking out Jason Gavern in six rounds at the "November Reign" event.

On 24 March Wach showed that he is a force to be reckoned with after scoring a six-round TKO over another giant, Tye Fields (49–5, 44 KOS). The event took place at the Resorts Hotel & Casino in Atlantic City, New Jersey and got coverage form ESPN's Friday Night Fights.

World title challenge

Wach vs. Klitschko
There was first mention of a potential showdown with unified world heavyweight champion Wladimir Klitschko in August 2011 when Klitschko's team approached Wach's promoters for a fight, however nothing materialized. Wach's promoter Global Boxing stated that it was Klitschko's advisor Shelly Finkel that contacted them. Bernd Boente denied these claims. In August 2012, serious negotiations took place for the fight. A date in November was considered with the venue likely to be in Hamburg, Germany. Terms were fully agreed within days of the negotiations for the fight to take place 10 November. Wach was the fourth Polish contender in history to try to win the world title in the heavyweight division. At 2.02 metres tall, with a reach of 2.08 metres and weighing 251 pounds, Wach was four centimetres taller than Klitschko with a reach two centimeters longer. In Poland, the fight was available via pay-per-view platform on Canal+ Sport for 39 zł and Polsat Sport for 40 zł.

On fight night, at the 02 World Arena, Mariusz Wach lost via one sided UD. The three judges' scored the fight 120–107, 120–107, and 119–109, all in favor of Klitschko. The bout opened with a battle between jabs which was won by Klitschko, who was following his jabs with his signature straight right. Wach managed to wobble Klitschko in round five but failed to take advantage. Wach also showed a great chin later in the fight when Klitschko began to let his hands go more landing thunderous shots. During the course of twelve rounds, Klitschko landed 274 of 693 punches landed (40%), whilst Wach landed 60 of his 308 thrown (19%). After the fight, there were allegations against Wach that he had used steroids.

Failed drug test
Wach failed a doping test after losing a world heavyweight title fight against Wladimir Klitschko. He admitted to doping in the bout against Klitschko and got sanctioned by the Federation of German Professional Boxing, but said that he plans to continue his career no matter how harsh the penalties are.

Wach vs. Whyte 
On 7 December, 2019, Wach fought title contender Dillian Whyte, who was ranked #1 by the WBC at heavyweight. Whyte was not at his best, but still managed to have control over most of the rounds, winning the bout via unanimous decision, 98-93, 97-93 and 97-93.

Wach vs. Johnson 
In his next fight, Wach fought Kevin Johnson. In a fight held without fans in attendance because of COVID restrictions, Wach managed to outpoint Johnson to a unanimous decision victory. The scorecards read 99-91, 98-92 and 97-93 in favor of the home fighter.

Wach vs. Fury 
In his next fight, Wach fought former world title challenger Hughie Fury. Wach managed to induce a cut on Fury in the fourth round and tried to target the cut area for the rest of the fight. Fury, however, rebounded well from the cut and outboxed Wach for the rest of the fight, earning a unanimous decision victory.

Professional boxing record

References

External links

Mariusz Wach - Profile, News Archive & Current Rankings at Box.Live

1979 births
Living people
Polish emigrants to the United States
Doping cases in boxing
People from North Bergen, New Jersey
Polish sportspeople in doping cases
Heavyweight boxers
Sportspeople from Kraków
Polish male boxers